Óscar Carrera (born 9 May 1991) is a Spanish sprint canoer.

He competed at the 2016 Summer Olympics in Rio de Janeiro, in the men's K-4 1000 metres.

References

1991 births
Living people
Spanish male canoeists
Olympic canoeists of Spain
Canoeists at the 2016 Summer Olympics
21st-century Spanish people